Francine Pascal's Sweet Valley High is an American comedy-drama television series loosely based on Francine Pascal's book series of the same name. The program starred Brittany Daniel and Cynthia Daniel as the two lead characters and ran from September 5, 1994, to October 14, 1997. The program was produced by Teen Dream Productions, Inc. in association with and distributed by Saban Entertainment in the United States, and its international sister company, Saban International N.V. in the Netherlands.

After three seasons in syndication (mostly on Fox stations),  the show moved to UPN for its fourth and final season in September 1997, where it was canceled the following month of October, due to low ratings. The show was also broadcast internationally, outside of the United States on BBC One in the UK.

Synopsis
The series revolves around the lives of Elizabeth and Jessica Wakefield, beautiful blonde twins who live in the fictitious Sweet Valley, California, and their gang of friends. Elizabeth is warm, friendly and sincere, while her twin sister Jessica is flirty, mischievous, and irresponsible.

Episodes

Cast and characters

 Brittany Daniel as Jessica "Jess" Wakefield, the outgoing, party loving, fashionable, and wilder Wakefield twin
 Cynthia Daniel as Elizabeth "Liz" Wakefield, the quieter, more sensible and down to earth Wakefield twin
 Amarilis (season 1) as Patty Gilbert, Jessica's cheerleader friend
 Ryan James Bittle (seasons 1–2) and Jeremy Vincent Garrett (seasons 3–4) as Todd Wilkins, Elizabeth's boyfriend
 Brock Burnett (season 1) and Christopher Jackson (season 2) as Bruce Patman, Todd and Winston's rival, and enemy of Jessica's 
 Amy Danles as Enid Rollins, Elizabeth's best friend 
 Bridget Flanery (seasons 1–2) and Shirlee Elliot (seasons 3–4) as Lila Fowler, Jessica's best friend
 Michael Perl as Winston Egbert, Todd's best friend 
 Harley Rodriguez as Manny Lopez, Todd's and Winston's friend, and early on the right-hand man to Bruce Patman, Enid's eventual boyfriend
 Tyffany Hayes (seasons 2–4) as Cheryl "Tatyana" Thomas, supermodel friend of Elizabeth, Jessica and Todd
 John Jocelyn (season 3) as Reginald "Shred" Patman, Bruce's cousin and Winston's friend
 Manley Pope (season 4) as Devon Whitelaw, boyfriend to Elizabeth and Jessica
 Andrea Savage (season 4) as Renata Vargas, Jessica's and Lila's friend, and briefly Todd's girlfriend

Production
It was announced that in June 1994 that twin sisters Brittany Daniel and Cynthia Daniel got cast in the series.

Home media
In August 1996, two Sweet Valley High VHS tapes were released by WarnerVision Entertainment and Saban Home Entertainment titled 'Kidnapped' and 'Dangerous Love', which featured exclusive music videos based on the songs featured in the TV series. Although more releases were planned, they never saw the light of day after WEA folded WarnerVision Entertainment into Warner Home Video and ended their agreement with Saban.

On March 8, 2005, Buena Vista Home Entertainment released the complete first season of Sweet Valley High on DVD in Region 1.  A DVD release of Season two was also planned, with an old promotional trailer being posted online in 2013; however, this release was canceled.

Soundtrack
In 1995, a soundtrack album was released featuring original songs that were in the series along with a longer version of the show's theme song (sung by Kathy Fisher).

Track listing
"Sweet Valley High Theme" (Long version)
"Lotion" (Jessica's Theme)
"Rose Colored Glasses"
"She's Got the Answers"
"Not Myself Today"
"Alive"
"Rest of My Life"
"My Jessica"
"All to Myself"
"Secrets"
"My World"
"On Our Own"
"She Walks in Roses"
"Sweet Valley High Theme" (TV version)

References

External links

 
 Sweet Valley Unlimited:: Your Source to Everything Sweet Valley
 Sweet Valley High: The Complete First Season DVD Review
 Sweet Valley High Complete Episode Guide
 Sweet Valley High theme song, season 1

1990s American comedy-drama television series
1990s American high school television series
1994 American television series debuts
1997 American television series endings
American television shows based on children's books
English-language television shows
First-run syndicated television programs in the United States
Sweet Valley (franchise)
Television shows based on American novels
Television series about twins
Television series by Saban Entertainment
Television shows set in California
UPN Kids
UPN original programming